Sobczyn  is a settlement in the administrative district of Gmina Ostrów Wielkopolski, within Ostrów Wielkopolski County, Greater Poland Voivodeship, in west-central Poland.

The settlement has a population of 6.

References

Sobczyn